Chena Hot Springs is an unincorporated community and hot spring resort in the Fairbanks North Star Borough, Alaska, United States, 56.5 miles northeast of Fairbanks near the Chena River State Recreation Area. The resort makes use of the first low-temperature binary geothermal power plant built in Alaska, and is working on several alternative energy projects, including production and use of hydrogen and vegetable oil for fuel. The resort is conducting collaborative experiments in greenhouse production of vegetables with the University of Alaska Fairbanks Agricultural and Forestry Experiment Station.

History 

Chena Hot Springs was founded over 100 years ago by two gold mining brothers, Robert and Thomas Swan. In 1905, Robert Swan was suffering from rheumatism and needed a place to calm his pain and be comfortable. The two brothers set out to find the hot springs. It took them a little over a month to reach the hot springs after searching for it in Interior Alaska’s harsh landscape. In 1911, twelve small cabins were built to accommodate visitors. The twelve cabins developed, establishing it as a resort in the interior of Alaska. The United States Department of Agriculture sent chemists to analyze the water.

Demographics 

Chena Hot Springs has never formally reported a population on the U.S. Census. The USGS reported it had an estimated summer population of 10 for the resort.

Weather 

The coordinates for Chena Hot Springs Alaska are 65'03 N and 146'03 W (65.05, -146.05).
The average snowfall amount in Chena Hot Springs is  annually.

Chena Hot Springs has visibility of the Aurora borealis, especially around the March equinox.

Aurora Ice Museum 

The Aurora Ice Museum contains carved ice sculptures and is located at the hot springs resort is open throughout the year. Some of the sculptures depict igloos, a large chess set, and jousting knights on horseback.

Geothermal Power Plant 

Chena Hot Springs Resort uses two 200kW Organic Rankine cycle (ORC) geothermal energy power plants to generate energy, the first in Alaska.  The resort moved the diesel generators used in the past to a backup role since July 2006, and it is successful in reducing the cost from 30 cents/kWh to 5 cents/kWh.

DC6 On Display

Everts Air Cargo retired the Douglas DC-6A N6174C “Good Grief” on October 2, 2016, after it made the final flight from Anchorage to Chena Hot Springs, after its 62-year flight career.

References

External links

 
 Renewable Energy Center
 Ice Museum and Geothermal Power Plant
 Wildlife from the Alaska Department of Fish and Game
 Weather

Agricultural buildings and structures in Alaska
Buildings and structures in Fairbanks North Star Borough, Alaska
Geothermal power stations in the United States
Hot springs of Alaska
Bodies of water of Fairbanks North Star Borough, Alaska
Power stations in Alaska
Resorts in the United States
Unincorporated communities in Fairbanks North Star Borough, Alaska
Tourist attractions in Fairbanks North Star Borough, Alaska
Unincorporated communities in Alaska